Tršće may refer to:

 Tršće, Bosnia and Herzegovina, a village near Kakanj
 Tršće, Croatia, a village near Čabar